Peter Bomm (born 9 December 1947) is a retired German football forward.

References

External links
 

1947 births
Living people
German footballers
Bundesliga players
VfL Bochum players
Association football forwards